Punch (1873–1894) was an illustrated conservative Danish satirical magazine modelled on the English Punch.

See also
 List of magazines in Denmark

References

1873 establishments in Denmark
1894 disestablishments in Denmark
Conservatism in Denmark
Conservative magazines
Danish-language magazines
Defunct magazines published in Denmark
Defunct political magazines
Magazines established in 1873
Magazines disestablished in 1894
Magazines published in Copenhagen
Satirical magazines published in Denmark
Political magazines published in Denmark